Philip Everett Curtiss (April 10, 1885 - May 23, 1964) was a politician, novelist, and newspaper reporter in Connecticut. He was born in Hartford, Connecticut. A Republican, he served in the General Assembly of the Connecticut Legislature from 1941 until 1947 and was a trial justice and  justice of the peace in Norfolk, Connecticut from 1940 until 1955. He also had his stories published in various magazines including Harper's Magazine. Yale University has a collection of his papers.

He graduated from Hartford Public High School and Trinity College (1906). At Trinity he ran track and was in glee club. He studied in Spain and France on a fellowship. He was a member of Psi Upsilon. He served in the Connecticut National Guard from 1910 - 1916 and was deployed to the border with Mexico. In 1910 he began working for the Hartford Courant and then the Hartford Times. He married Maude Ida Frederica Knust and they had two daughters.

He died in Winsted, Connecticut after a long illness.

Bibliography
Between Two Worlds, Harper & Brothers, New York 1916
The Ladder: The story of a casual man Harper & Brothers, New York 1915
Two Worlds 1916
 Mummers in Mufti The Century Co., New York, 1922
 The Gay Conspirators 1924

Further reading
Young Hartford writer who is gaining distinction Hartford Courant (pay for access)

References

External links 

 Philip Everett Curtiss Papers. Yale Collection of American Literature, Beinecke Rare Book and Manuscript Library.

1885 births
1964 deaths
Trinity Bantams athletes
Connecticut National Guard personnel
Republican Party members of the Connecticut House of Representatives
Politicians from Hartford, Connecticut
20th-century American politicians